The Colombian Roller Hockey Championship is the biggest Roller Hockey Clubs Championship in Colombia.
The most recent winner is M.H.C, team from Manizales.

Participated Teams in the last Season
 SUPER PATÍN
 MIMBRE 
 MANIZALES H.C.
 INTERNACIONAL
 F.C.M. ROLLING
 CORAZONISTA A
 BUFALOS
 HALCONES
 SIETE RIOS
 CORAZONISTA B
 R.M.C.
 REAL
 MANIZALES B
 HUNTER´S
 HURACANES

List of Winners

References

External links

Colombian websites
Hockey sobre patines Colombia 
Valle Patin
Bogota's hockey
Del Cafe - Manizales
Centauros HC
Hockey Manizales
Datos de Torneos Intercolegiados
Hockey Fotos
Club Halcones
Campana HC
CH Huracanes Buga
D'Rapeg HC
FundaHockey

International
 Roller Hockey links worldwide
 Mundook-World Roller Hockey
Hardballhock-World Roller Hockey
Inforoller World Roller Hockey 
 World Roller Hockey Blog
rink-hockey-news - World Roller Hockey

Roller hockey competitions in Colombia
Colombia
Recurring sporting events established in 1996
1996 establishments in Colombia
Roller Hockey